The Post-Truth World is a 2022 Taiwanese crime mystery film directed by Chen I-fu, starring Joseph Chang, Edward Chen, Caitlin Fang, Aviis Zhong, and Amber An.

Premise
Chang, a former rising sports star who has been jailed for murdering his girlfriend seven years prior, escapes from the prison and brazenly takes hostage of Liu, once a top media personality. As public attention on the case continues to heighten, Liu decides to investigate Chang as a way to get back in the spotlight.

Cast
 Joseph Chang as Liu Li-min
 Edward Chen as Chang Cheng-yi
 Caitlin Fang as Liu Chen-chen
 Aviis Zhong as Hsu Ya-ching
 Amber An as Chang Cheng-yi's sister
 Shih Chih-tian as Fu Lin
 Chan Tzu-hsuan as Wang Shih-yun

Awards and nominations

References

External links
 
 
 

2022 films
2022 crime films
2020s mystery films
Taiwanese crime films
Taiwanese mystery films
Films about prison escapes
2020s Mandarin-language films